The 1977 Clemson Tigers football team was an American football team that represented Clemson University in the Atlantic Coast Conference (ACC) during the 1977 NCAA Division I football season. In its first season under head coach Charley Pell, the team compiled an 8–3–1 record (4–1–1 against conference opponents), finished second in the ACC, lost to Pittsburgh in the 1977 Gator Bowl, was ranked No. 19 in the final AP Poll, and outscored opponents by a total of 228 to 163. The team played its home games at Memorial Stadium in Clemson, South Carolina.

Steve Fuller, Steve Godfrey, and Randy Scott were the team captains. The team's statistical leaders included Steve Fuller with 1,497 passing yards, Warren Ratchford with 616 rushing yards, Jerry Butler with 760 receiving yards, and Lester Brown with 54 points (9 touchdowns).

Schedule

Roster

Season summary

South Carolina

References

Clemson
Clemson Tigers football seasons
Clemson Tigers football